The particle horizon (also called the cosmological horizon, the comoving horizon (in Dodelson's text), or the cosmic light horizon) is the maximum distance from which light from particles could have traveled to the observer in the age of the universe. Much like the concept of a terrestrial horizon, it represents the boundary between the observable and the unobservable regions of the universe, so its distance at the present epoch defines the size of the observable universe. Due to the expansion of the universe, it is not simply the age of the universe times the speed of light (approximately 13.8 billion light-years), but rather the speed of light times the conformal time. The existence, properties, and significance of a cosmological horizon depend on the particular cosmological model.

Conformal time and the particle horizon
In terms of comoving distance, the particle horizon is equal to the conformal time   that has passed since the Big Bang, times the speed of light . In general, the conformal time at a certain time    is given by

By convention, a subscript 0 indicates "today" so that the conformal time today . Rather, the conformal time is the amount of time it would take a photon to travel from where we are located to the furthest observable distance, provided the universe ceased expanding. As such,  is not a physically meaningful time (this much time has not yet actually passed); though, as we will see, the particle horizon with which it is associated is a conceptually meaningful distance.

The particle horizon recedes constantly as time passes and the conformal time grows. As such, the observed size of the universe always increases. Since proper distance at a given time is just comoving distance times the scale factor (with comoving distance normally defined to be equal to proper distance at the present time, so  at present), the proper distance to the particle horizon at time  is given by

and for today

Evolution of the particle horizon

In this section we consider the FLRW cosmological model. In that context, the universe can be approximated as composed by non-interacting constituents, each one being a perfect fluid with density , partial pressure  and state equation , such that they add up to the total density   and total pressure . Let us now define the following functions:

 Hubble function   
 The critical density   
 The i-th dimensionless energy density   
 The dimensionless energy density 
 The redshift  given by the formula   

Any function with a zero subscript denote the function evaluated at the present time  (or equivalently ). The last term can be taken to be  including the curvature state equation. It can be proved that the Hubble function is given by

where the dilution exponent . Notice that the addition ranges over all possible partial constituents and in particular there can be countably infinitely many. With this notation we have:

where  is the largest  (possibly infinite). The evolution of the particle horizon for an expanding universe is:

where  is the speed of light and can be taken to be  (natural units). Notice that the derivative is made with respect to the FLRW-time , while the functions are evaluated at the redshift  which are related as stated before. We have an analogous but slightly different result for event horizon.

Horizon problem

The concept of a particle horizon can be used to illustrate the famous horizon problem, which is an unresolved issue associated with the Big Bang model. Extrapolating back to the time of recombination when the cosmic microwave background (CMB) was emitted, we obtain a particle horizon of about

which corresponds to a proper size at that time of:

Since we observe the CMB to be emitted essentially from our particle horizon, our expectation is that parts of the cosmic microwave background (CMB) that are separated by about a fraction of a great circle across the sky of

(an angular size of ) should be out of causal contact with each other. That the entire CMB is in thermal equilibrium and approximates a blackbody so well is therefore not explained by the standard explanations about the way the expansion of the universe proceeds. The most popular resolution to this problem is cosmic inflation.

See also

Cosmological horizon
Observable universe

References 

Physical cosmology